Toussaint Bertin de la Doué (or Thomas Bertin de la Doué)  (1680 – 6 February 1743) was a French composer of the Baroque era. He worked as an organist for the Theatines, as a musician for the Duc d'Orléans and as a violinist and harpsichordist at the Paris Opéra (between 1714 and 1734). He wrote sacred music, songs, trios for two violins and basso continuo, and several operas.

Operas 
Cassandre (tragédie en musique, 1706) (with François Bouvard)
Diomède (tragédie en musique, 1710)
Ajax (tragédie en musique, 1712)
Le jugement de Pâris (pastorale héroïque, 1718)
Les plaisirs de la campagne (opéra-ballet, 1719)

Sources
Le magazine de l'opéra baroque by Jean-Claude Brenac (in French)

1680 births
1743 deaths
French Baroque composers
French male classical composers
French opera composers
Male opera composers
18th-century classical composers
18th-century French composers
18th-century French male musicians
17th-century male musicians